Garciadelia is a plant genus of the family Euphorbiaceae first described as a genus in 2010. The entire genus is endemic to the Island of Hispaniola in the West Indies (divided between Haiti and the Dominican Republic. It is a member of the Leucocroton alliance, which also includes Leucocroton and Lasiocroton. Species in this alliance are dioecious.

Species
 Garciadelia abbottii Jestrow & Jiménez Rodr. - Dominican Republic
 Garciadelia castilloae Jestrow & Jiménez Rodr. - Dominican Republic
 Garciadelia leprosa (Willd.) Jestrow & Jiménez Rodr. - Haiti, Dominican Republic
 Garciadelia mejiae Jestrow & Jiménez Rodr. - Dominican Republic

References

Adelieae
Flora of Haiti
Flora of the Dominican Republic
Euphorbiaceae genera
Dioecious plants